"Desirée" is a 1977 song written and recorded by Neil Diamond and included as a track on Diamond's 1977 album, I'm Glad You're Here with Me Tonight. The single peaked at number 16 on the Billboard Hot 100 and reached number one on the U.S. Easy Listening chart to become his fifth number one on that chart.  The song likewise reached number one on the Canadian AC chart.

Cash Box said that it has an "infectious intro on the grand piano" and that Diamond is "at the top of his form." Record World said that the song "rocks lightly, and is arranged to focus attention on the provocative lyrics."

It was used as the first long-distance dedication on American Top 40 on the show aired August 26, 1978.

Chart history

Weekly charts

Year-end charts

See also
List of number-one adult contemporary singles of 1978 (U.S.)

References

1977 singles
Neil Diamond songs
Songs written by Neil Diamond
Song recordings produced by Bob Gaudio
1977 songs
Songs about nostalgia
Columbia Records singles